Roxita eurydyce is a moth in the family Crambidae. It was described by Stanisław Błeszyński in 1963. It is found in Guangdong, China.

References

Crambinae
Moths described in 1963